Yury Golubev (born 1906, date of death unknown) was a Soviet sailor. He competed in the Dragon event at the 1952 Summer Olympics.

References

External links
 

1906 births
Year of death missing
Soviet male sailors (sport)
Olympic sailors of Belgium
Sailors at the 1952 Summer Olympics – Dragon
Place of birth missing